Rita Batata (born January 2, 1986) is a Brazilian actress.

Biography 
Rita Batata has been active since the age of 16, working in theater, film and television. She graduated in Performing Arts from the INDAC Course of Actors. Her debut in the theater was in 2003 when starring in the play '  Belinha and the Beast  '; since then, Batata has performed in several plays.
She is the protagonist of De Menor, a film of Caru Alves de Souza that won the best fiction prize of the Rio Festival in 2013.

Filmography

Television

Cinema

Awards and nominations

References

Actresses from São Paulo
1986 births
Living people